The Lambrakis Press Group S.A. was a Greek media company.

Since 1957, it was controlled by Christos Lambrakis and played a dominant role in Greek publishing and Greek politics, especially through its flagship newspapers, To Vima and Ta Nea. The group also owned the news portal In.gr, the radio station Vima Fm 99.5 and the magazines MarieClaire, Cosmopolitan and Vita.

In July 2017, a Greek first-instance court confirmed that the group would be acquired by Alter Ego Media S.A., a company including the media assets of Greek businessman Evangelos Marinakis. The court approval for the transfer ownership of DOL to Alter Ego followed the latter's success as the highest bidder in an auction process held earlier in 2017.

However, on 11 July 2019, the Athens first-instance court declared DOL to be in a state of bankruptcy, after its debt of over 265 million was not covered by the payment Marinakis had contributed to acquire the organisation with.

Management
The Company and the Group are managed by the board of directors with the following members:
President of the Board: Evangelos Marinakis
Vice President of the Board: 
Managing Director: 
Board members have minimum influence over company; they consist of:

References

External links
 Dolnet.gr (Company publications website)
 Lambrakis Press S.A. (Official company website)

Newspaper companies of Greece
Publishing companies established in 1922